Borbo fanta, the Fanta swift or twin-spot swift, is a butterfly in the family Hesperiidae. It is found in the Gambia, Guinea, Sierra Leone, Ivory Coast, Ghana, Nigeria, Cameroon, Gabon, Angola, the Democratic Republic of the Congo, south-western Kenya, Tanzania, central and northern Zambia, Mozambique, eastern Zimbabwe and northern Botswana. The habitat consists of savanna and degraded forests.

The larvae feed on Bambusa vulgaris.

References

Butterflies described in 1937
Hesperiinae